Trevor  Lyn Daniel (born December 8, 1994) is an American football punter who is a free agent. He played college football at Tennessee.

Early years
Daniel was raised in Dickson, Tennessee. He  watched Tennessee Volunteer football games with his grandfather leading to his desire as a child to play for them.

College career
Daniel was a punter for the Tennessee Volunteers in college. In the 2015 season, Daniel executed a punt late in the rivalry game against Georgia that helped set up the Vols' first victory over the Bulldogs in several years. The punt went out of bounds on the Bulldogs' half-yard line. In his four years with the Volunteers, Daniel's average punting average was fifth in the nation.

Daniel was the Ray Guy Punter of the Week in early September 2017.
He finished the 2017 season ranked 2nd nationally with a 95.99 GPR Punt Rating.

Professional career

Houston Texans
Daniel was signed by the Houston Texans as an undrafted free agent in 2018. Daniel won the punting job in 2018, beating out 18-year NFL veteran Shane Lechler. He made his NFL debut in the Texans' season opener against the New England Patriots. He had six punts for 230 net yards in the 27–20 loss. In the 2018 season, he had 74 punts for 3,237 net yards for a 43.74 average.

On September 17, 2019, Daniel was waived by the Texans.

Denver Broncos
On December 31, 2019, Daniel signed a reserve/future contract with the Denver Broncos. He was waived on April 23, 2020.

Tennessee Titans
On November 7, 2020, Daniel was signed to the Tennessee Titans practice squad. He was elevated to the active roster on November 12 for the team's week 10 game against the Indianapolis Colts, and reverted to the practice squad after the game. He was promoted to the active roster on November 19. Daniel was waived by the Titans on November 24, 2020, and re-signed to the practice squad two days later. He was placed on the practice squad/COVID-19 list by the team on December 8, 2020, and restored to the practice squad on December 19. His practice squad contract with the team expired after the season on January 18, 2021.

References

1994 births
Living people
People from Dickson, Tennessee
Players of American football from Tennessee
American football punters
Tennessee Volunteers football players
Houston Texans players
Denver Broncos players
Tennessee Titans players